DePauw University, a small liberal arts college located in Greencastle, Indiana, bears the distinction of having an unusually high membership rate in Greek fraternities and sororities, rating consistently above 70% in recent years. For 2014, DePauw University was again ranked #1 in Greek Life by the Princeton Review. A position the school has held several times since over the past 15 years including a stretch of 7 consecutive years (2002-2008).

Active fraternities
 Alpha Tau Omega - , ATOs, founded at DePauw in 1924.
 Beta Theta Pi - , Betas, founded at DePauw in 1845.  
 Delta Tau Delta - , Delts, founded at DePauw in 1882.
 Delta Upsilon - , DUs, founded at DePauw in 1887.
 Lambda Sigma Upsilon - , Elegua, founded at DePauw in 2012.
 Phi Delta Theta - , Phi Delts, founded at DePauw in 1868.
 Phi Gamma Delta - /FIJI, founded at DePauw in 1856.  Currently the oldest active chapter of its fraternity.
 Phi Kappa Psi - , Phi Psis, founded at DePauw in 1865.
 Sigma Chi - , Sigs, founded at DePauw in 1859.
 Sigma Nu - , Beta Beta Chapter, Sig Nus or SNus, founded at DePauw in 1890.
 Sigma Alpha Epsilon - , SAEs, founded at DePauw in 1949. Suspended by its national organization during the 2016-2017 academic year. The fraternity became active again in 2019.

Active sororities

 Alpha Chi Omega - ΑΧΏ -Alpha chapter, founded at DePauw in 1885.
 Alpha Phi -  -Gamma chapter, founded at DePauw in 1887
 Delta Gamma -  -Gamma Iota, founded at DePauw in 1949
 Kappa Alpha Theta -  -Alpha chapter, founded at DePauw in 1870, Theta is the  first Greek-letter women's fraternity.
 Kappa Kappa Gamma -  -Iota chapter, founded at DePauw in 1875.
 Pi Beta Phi -  -Indiana Epsilon chapter, founded at DePauw in 1942.
 Psi Lambda Xi -  -A local sorority founded in March, 2007.
 Alpha Kappa Alpha
 Zeta Phi Beta
 Sigma Lambda Gamma
 Omega Phi Beta
 Delta Sigma Theta

Inactive fraternities

 Delta Kappa Epsilon
 Lambda Chi Alpha
 Delta Chi

Inactive sororities

 Alpha Gamma Delta
 Alpha Omicron Pi
 Delta Delta Delta
 Delta Zeta - Closed as of summer 2007.  This status may be affected by an ongoing lawsuit brought against DePauw University by the Delta Zeta national organization.

Specialized Greek-letter organizations
 Alpha Phi Omega - A coeducational volunteerism/service fraternity.  Active.
 Alpha Psi Omega - A coeducational honor society for students involved in the theatrical arts. Active.
 Chi Alpha Sigma - A coeducational honor society for athletes.  Alpha chapter founded at DePauw by former head football coach Nick Mourouzis.  Active.
 Mu Phi Epsilon - A coeducational music fraternity.  Active.
 Phi Mu Alpha Sinfonia - A men's music fraternity.  Inactive.
 Sigma Delta Chi - Now known as the Society of Professional Journalists, the national organization was founded at DePauw in 1909.  Active.

Sources
 https://web.archive.org/web/20070528160952/http://www.depauw.edu/student/greek/greeklistings.asp
 http://www.depauw.edu/news/index.asp?id=17940
 http://www.depauw.edu/news/index.asp?id=16880

Notes

DePauw University
DePauw University